

 
Nicholson is a locality in the Northern Territory of Australia located in the territory's east adjoining the border with the state of Queensland  about  south-east of the territory capital of Darwin.

The locality consists of the following land (from north to south, then west to east):
 The Waannyi/Garawa Aboriginal Lands Trust
Land described as NT Portion 561, and the Mittiehan and Mount Drummond pastoral leases, and 
The Alexandria pastoral lease.

The locality's boundaries and name were gazetted on 4 April 2007.  Its name is derived from the Nicholson River which was named by the explorer Ludwig Leichhardt during his 1844/45 expedition after "Dr William Alleyne Nicholson of Bristol, England."

The 2016 Australian census which was conducted in August 2016 reports that Nicholson had a population of 60 people.

Nicholson is located within the federal division of Lingiari, the territory electoral division of Barkly and the local government area of the Barkly Region.

References

Populated places in the Northern Territory
Barkly Region